Benson Kiplangat (born 17 June 2003) is a Kenyan long-distance runner who specializes in the 5000 metres. He was the gold medallist at the World Athletics U20 Championships in 2021.

References

External links 

 Benson Kiplangat at World Athletics

2003 births
Kenyan male long-distance runners
Living people
World Athletics U20 Championships winners